The following is a list of episodes from the television series Monster Buster Club. There are currently 40 episodes which have aired in different orders depending on the country it airs in. There is a total of 52 episodes running 26 minutes each. The show is currently in its second season in America and UK. Canada still has not announced the airing of season 2. Disney Channel Asia also stopped airing the show since March 2009.

Series overview
{|class="wikitable plainrowheaders" style="text-align:center;"
!colspan="2" rowspan="2"|Season
!rowspan="2"|Episodes
!colspan="2"|Originally aired
|-
!First aired
!Last aired
|-
|style="background: #7fffd4;"|
|[[List of Monster Buster Club episodes#Season 1 (2008)|1]]
|26
|
|
|-
|style="background: #6927B1;"|
|[[List of Monster Buster Club episodes#Season 2 (2009)|2]]
|26
|
|
|}

Episodes

Season 1 (2008)

Season 2 (2009)

References

Lists of Canadian children's animated television series episodes
Lists of French animated television series episodes